My Lady Molly is a 'comedy opera' in two acts with a libretto by George H. Jessop, with additional lyrics by Percy Greenbank and Charles H. Taylor, and music by Sidney Jones.  The story centers around Lady Molly Martingale, a vivacious young woman, who disguises herself as a man to win the man she loves.

The piece opened at the Theatre Royal in Brighton, England, on 11 August 1902 and then at Terry's Theatre in London on 14 March 1903, under the management of Frederick Mouillot, running for 342 performances.  It starred Sybil Arundale and featured Decima Moore.  It also enjoyed tours and had a brief Broadway run.

My Lady Molly was the last successful English comic opera in the tradition of Alfred Cellier's Dorothy and Arthur Sullivan's Haddon Hall, as distinguished from the style of the lighter Edwardian musical comedies of the period.  A review in The Daily Mail stated:

Roles and original cast

Captain Harry Romney – Richard Green
Lionel Bland – Walter Hyde
Sir Miles Coverdale – Chas. F. Cooke
Mickey O'dowd   (Servant to Captain Harry) – Bert Gilbert
Landlord   (of the Coverdale Arms) – H. M. Imano
Head Groom – William Waite
Rev. Silas Wapshott   (Vicar of Coverdale) – Walter Wright
Judge Romney   (father to Harry) – Cecil Howard
Lady Molly Martindale – Sybil Arundale/Mavis Hope 
Hester   (her confidential maid) – Mabel Allen
Alice Coverdale   (daughter to Sir Miles) – Decima Moore
Mademoiselle Mirabeau   (governess to Alice) – Andrée Corday
Housekeeper   (at Coverdale Arms) – Dorothy Cameron
Lucy and Allison   (chambermaids) – Miss Arundale and Rose Batchelor

Musical numbers

Overture 
Act I – The Courtyard at Coverdale Arms.   "Morning."
No. 1 - Chorus - "Brushes and brooms sweeping the corridors, dusting the rooms, up with the lark..." 
No. 1a - Landlord - "There is the Key.   Let ev'ry man go in and fetch his measure of bran..." 
No. 2 - Landlord, with Chorus - "A man may know no voice of friend; may travel far from kith and kin..." 
No. 3 - Lionel & Chorus of Maidservants - "There's a little maid I know.  She is so very sweet..." 
No. 4 - Alice & Lionel - "When we were children, I and you, of course you recollect..." 
Nos. 4a & 5 - Recit. & Quartette - Mirabeau, Alice, Lionel & Landlord - "Your worship's breakfast waits..." 
No. 6 - Mickey, with Chorus - "Ye sarve a man for sivin years and follow him about..." 
No. 7 - Lady Molly & Hester - "Oh, I'll greet him soft and low, fan the old-time embers..." 
No. 8 - Lady Molly, Hester & Mickey - "Wear 'em wid an air, hat an' boots an' them things..." 
No. 9 - Chorus and Solo, Sir Miles - "Ye-ho yoicks! Run to earth, there's the sign! ..." 
No. 10 - Alice, with Chorus - "Now a gallant knight lov'd a maiden fair in medieval fashion..." 
No. 11 - Chorus - "Topers, fling your glasses aside; quit your vows, Sir Lover..." 
No. 12 -  Harry & Lionel - "Though you may choose your future bride, I do not dread what you may do..." 
No. 13 - Chorus & Trio - Molly, Hester & Mickey - "Maggie, Winnie, Catkin, Minnie, Alison and Sue..." 
No. 14 - Chorus, Recit. amp; Song - Harry - "We saw the swords, upon our words!  the naked steel flash'd out! ..." 
No. 15 - Finale Act I - "Rogue detected!  There's a gentleman present here, now in this room..." 

Act II – The Hall in Coverdale Castle.   "Night."
No. 16 - Chorus - "How do you do?  And you, my dear?   You rode, no doubt;  I came by post..." 
No. 17 - Alice & Chorus - "I know that I've been naughty all my life; my conduct's most provoking, I'm afraid..." 
No. 18 - Mickey & Mirabeau - "It's dreadfully hard to understand the things you foreigners say..." 
No. 19 - Lady Molly - "When a maiden is wooed by a man, his advances she frequently spurns..." 
No. 20 - Sir Miles, Alice & Lady Molly, with Chorus - "Yoicks ho!  Were I younger I'd teach you to dance..." 
No. 21 - Harry - "There's an eye that is watching me all unseen, a bold dark eye with a winsome light..." 
No. 22 - Alice, Molly, Lionel & Harry - "Suppose a Highwayman you were, and went to rob a coach..." 
No. 23 - Entrance of Bridesmaids, and Song - Hester - "What a show of pretty things, light and airy..." 
No. 24 - Flower Chorus - "A chance, dear girls, to exercise your pow'rs; we're ask'd to deck the castle for the fête..." 
No. 25 - Mickey O'Dowd - "There's times when the world is a beautiful place, wid niver an ache nor a trouble..." 
No. 26 - Chorus - Bridal March - "Now the chancel waits the bride, brilliantly lighted, radiant with flow'rs..." 
No. 27 - Song - Mirabeau - "'Opeless ze state of me, sad ees ze fate of me, bygone ze date of me..." 
No. 28 - Chorus - Bridal March - "What has happened, what's the matter?  Is it that the bride was nervous? ..." 
No. 29 - Molly & Harry - "I craved for that kiss last year, and a word that you would not say..." 
No. 30 - Finale Act II - "But today, yes, today hope blossoms anew, and the weary days were not all in vain..."

References
Notes

External links
Vocal score
Song list, roles and other information
Links to Midi files, lyrics and cast list
My Lady Molly at the Internet Broadway Database
Information about shows opening in London in 1903
Fashions in My Lady Molly.
Photos from a 1927 production by the Torquay Amateur Operatic Society

English-language operas
English comic operas
Operas
1902 operas
Musicals by Sidney Jones